, also known as TSB, is a Japanese broadcast network affiliated with NNN and NNS. Their headquarters are located in Nagano Prefecture.

History 
In July 1971, Kiichiro Takizawa applied for the license of the third private TV station in Nagano prefecture under the name of Shinshu TV Broadcasting, which was the first application for the third private broadcaster in Nagano Prefecture.

Stations

Analog stations 
Utsukushigahara (Main Station) JONI-TV 30ch 10 kW
Yamanouchi 6ch 3w
Iiyama 43ch 50w
Zenkoji-daira 40ch 200w
Matsumoto 48ch 100w
Sanada 42ch 100w
Saku 34ch 30w
Karuizawa 53ch 10w
Okaya-Suwa 59ch 200w
Ina 59ch 100w
Iida 42ch 1 kW

Digital stations(ID:4)
Utsukushigahara (Main Station) JONI-DTV 14ch 1 kW
Zenkoji-daira 22ch 20w
Matsumoto 22ch 10w
Okaya-Suwa 53ch 20w
Ina 22ch 10w
Iida 35ch 100w

Rival stations
Shin-etsu Broadcasting (SBC)
Nagano Broadcasting Systems (NBS)
Asahi Broadcasting Nagano (abn)

External links
 TV. Shinshu

References

Television stations in Japan
Companies based in Nagano Prefecture
Nippon News Network
Television channels and stations established in 1980